Bill Bailey's Birdwatching Bonanza is a British game show that is produced by Fever Media and Glass Box that was broadcast on Sky1 between 8 January and 12 February 2010. The show is presented by Bill Bailey who sets two teams birdwatching challenges over a three-day period. The teams are led by Alex Zane and Jeff Green.

Episode list
The coloured backgrounds denote the result of each of the shows:
 – indicates Alex's team won
 – indicates Jeff's team won
 – indicates the game ended in a draw

Notes

References

External links

2010s British game shows
2010 British television series debuts
2010 British television series endings
Sky UK original programming